Katarzyna Ewa Skowrońska-Dolata (born 30 June 1983) is a former Polish volleyball player, a member of Poland women's national volleyball team and Italian club Foppapedretti Bergamo, double European Champion (2003, 2005), gold medalist of Italian, Turkish, Chinese and Azeri national championships.

Personal life
Skowrońska was born in Warsaw, Poland. On June 17, 2006 she married Jakub Dolata, her manager.

Early Years 
She became interested in volleyball as a teenager, after watching her brother play the sport. As a 15 year old Skowrońska went to the School of Sports Championship Polish Volleyball Federation in Sosnowiec and started to play as a middle blocker. Her first success when she was a student of this school was the gold medal of Cadet European Championship 1999 and Junior European Championship 2000.

Career
Skowrońska-Dolata began her career as an attacker at the club Skra Warszawa, where her coach was Teofil Czerwiński. In 2003 she debuted in the Polish national team. During her debut season she won the title of European Champion 2003 in Ankara, Turkey.

In 2001-2003, she was a player of AZS AWF Danter Poznań and won with this club a silver medal of Polish Championship in season 2002/2003. Then after two seasons 2003-2005 in Polish club Nafta-Gaz Piła and winning a bronze medal of Polish Championship 2004/2005 she moved to Italian League to Vicenza Volley, where spent season 2005/2006. In 2005 the Polish national team repeated its success from 2003 and Skowrońska won the second title of European Champion 2005 in Zagreb, Croatia. For her sport achievements, she received the Golden Cross of Merit in 2005 by Aleksander Kwaśniewski. In 2007 Skowrońska achieve a title of Best Scorer in FIVB World Cup despite the fact that Poland has not won a qualifications for the Olympic Games.

In the 2007-8 season she won a bronze medal in the CEV Champions League as well as the title of Best Scorer in the tournament alongside Asystel Novara. In 2008 she played at Olympic Games 2008. However the Polish women's national team was eliminated in the group stage. In 2008-2010 she played for the Italian side Scavolini Pesaro, a two-year period that was to prove amongst the most successful of her career. In 2008/2009 she won a SuperCup 2008, Italian Cup. She also won for the first time Italian Champion. In 2009/2010 she won the SuperCup 2009 and the Italian Champion for the second time.

At the end of the 2009/10 season, Skowrońska-Dolata moved to Turkish side Fenerbahçe Acıbadem Istanbul.
Here Katarzyna won the 2010 FIVB World Club Championship, played in Doha, Qatar. She earned the Most Valuable Player and the Best Scorer awards. Skowrońska won the bronze medal with Fenerbahçe Acıbadem at the CEV Champions League 2010/2011. In the same season she won the title of Turkish Champion. In 2011 she moved to Chinese club  - Guangdong Evergrande. With this club she won the title of Chinese Champion 2011/2012, silver medal of Chinese Championship 2012/2013 and Asian Club Championship 2013. In 2013 moved to Azeri Rabita Baku. She won the bronze medal of the CEV Champions League 2013/2014 after losing match (0-3) against Russian Dinamo Kazan in the semifinals, but defeating 3-0 to the Turkish Eczacıbaşı VitrA Istanbul in the third place match.

Skowrońska won a title of Azeri Champion 2013/2014 after winning match 3-0 against Baki-Azeryol and Skowrońska was Best Scorer  and Most Valuable Player of the final series. In March 2014 Skowrońska-Dolata signed a new one-year contract with Rabita. In season 2013/2014 she achieved title of Azeri Champion and bronze medal of CEV Champions League.

In May 2015 she signed a contract with Polish club Impel Wrocław, making a return to the Polish league after a period of 10 years. She took part in 1st edition of European Games. Skowrońska-Dolata helped Poland beat Serbia  in the semifinals, thereby qualifying for the tournaments final. On June 27, 2015 Poland was beaten by Turkey and Skowrońska-Dolata with her teammates achieved silver medal.

Sporting achievements

CEV Champions League

  2007/2008 - with Asystel Novara
  2010/2011 - with Fenerbahçe Acıbadem Istanbul
  2013/2014 - with Rabita Baku

FIVB Club World Championship

  Qatar 2010 - with Fenerbahçe Acıbadem Istanbul

Asian Club Championship

  2013 Vietnam - with Guangdong Evergrande

National championships

 2002/2003  Polish Championship, with AZS AWF Danter Poznań
 2004/2005  Polish Championship, with Nafta-Gaz Piła
 2008/2009  Italian SuperCup2008, with Scavolini Pesaro
 2008/2009  Italian Cup, with Scavolini Pesaro
 2008/2009  Italian Championship, with Scavolini Pesaro
 2009/2010  Italian SuperCup2009, with Scavolini Pesaro
 2009/2010  Italian Championship, with Scavolini Pesaro
 2010/2011  Turkish SuperCup2010, with Fenerbahçe Acıbadem Istanbul
 2010/2011  Turkish Championship, with Fenerbahçe Acıbadem Istanbul
 2011/2012  Chinese Championship, with Guangdong Evergrande
 2012/2013  Chinese Championship, with Guangdong Evergrande
 2013/2014  Azeri Championship, with Rabita Baku
 2014/2015  Azeri Championship, with Rabita Baku

National team
 1999  CEV U18 European Championship
 2000  CEV U20 European Championship
 2003  CEV European Championship
 2005  CEV European Championship
 2015  European Games

Individually
 2007 FIVB World Cup - Best Scorer
 2008 CEV Champions League - Best Scorer
 2010 FIVB World Club Championship - Best Scorer
 2010 FIVB World Club Championship - Most Valuable Player
 2012 Chinese Championship - Best Scorer
 2013 Chinese Championship - Best Scorer
 2014 Azeri Championship - Best Scorer
 2014 Azeri Championship - Most Valuable Player

State awards
 2005  Gold Cross of Merit

References

External links
 Official site 

1983 births
Living people
Volleyball players from Warsaw
Sportspeople from Masovian Voivodeship
Polish women's volleyball players
Olympic volleyball players of Poland
Volleyball players at the 2008 Summer Olympics
Fenerbahçe volleyballers
Recipients of the Gold Cross of Merit (Poland)
Polish expatriates in Italy
Expatriate volleyball players in Italy
Polish expatriate sportspeople in Turkey
Expatriate volleyball players in Turkey
Polish expatriates in China
Expatriate volleyball players in China
Volleyball players at the 2015 European Games
European Games medalists in volleyball
European Games silver medalists for Poland